Babayurtovsky District is an administrative and municipal district (raion), one of the forty-one in the Republic of Dagestan, Russia. It is located in the northern central part of the republic. Its administrative center is the rural locality (a selo) of Babayurt. As of the 2010 Census, the total population of the district was 45,701, with the population of Babayurt accounting for 33.3% of that number.

Administrative and municipal status
Within the framework of administrative divisions, Babayurtovsky District is one of the forty-one in the Republic of Dagestan. The district is divided into seven selsoviets which comprise twenty-two rural localities. As a municipal division, the district is incorporated as Babayurtovsky Municipal District. Its seven selsoviets are incorporated as fifteen rural settlements within the municipal district. The selo of Babayurt serves as the administrative center of both the administrative and municipal district.

References

Notes

Sources

Districts of Dagestan
